Nick Jr. is a 24-hour children's channel in Australia designed for pre-schoolers. Nick Jr. was a morning programming block on Nickelodeon until 2004, when Foxtel launched it as a full 24-hour kids channel. The channel is run by Foxtel Networks, under license from Paramount Networks UK & Australia, and is also available on Optus Television and FetchTV.

History

Before Nick Jr. officially launched as a 24-hour TV channel, it was part of Nickelodeon's morning line-up which included such shows as Blue's Clues, Dora the Explorer and Oswald, the block itself was also joined by a presenter known as "Face" which presented the Australian-input from 1998 until 2006, the Australian-input was also the last of the few international Nick Jr. block to have Face being replaced, as others stopped using him by 2004 and 2005, the actor who voiced the Australian dubbed Face is currently unknown.

On 21 January 2004, Foxtel announced a brand new digital service along with new channel line-ups which included Nick Jr. On 14 March 2004, Nick Jr. officially launched to be the first 24-hour Australian kids channel to play shows suited for pre-schoolers.

For a few months after Nick Jr. became a full channel, it kept a two-hour time slot on Nickelodeon in the mornings from 8:00 am until 10:00 am, but the time allocated to the block was far shorter than it was before it became a full channel.

The channel introduced some original short-form programming, including Cooking for Kids with Luis and Gardening for Kids with Madi.

The channel used the new Nick Jr. logo from Friday 26 March 2010. From 2004 until 2010, the channel used a localised logo with two kangaroos with the tradition of 'Nick' (representing the adult) and 'Jr.' (as the child).

On 29 February  2012, a 60-second anthem aired.

On 3 December 2013, Nick Jr. became available on Foxtel's streaming service Foxtel Go.

On 1 January 2014, Nick Jr. launched on Australian IPTV provider FetchTV.

The channel aired for a time as a two-hour block in the afternoons on Sky Television in New Zealand, until this ceased in 2013.

Programming

Current programming

 44 Cats (2020–present)
 Abby Hatcher (2020–present)
 The Adventures of Paddington (2020–present)
 Baby Shark's Big Show! (2020–present)
 Barbapapa: One Big Happy Family! (2020–present)
 Ben & Holly's Little Kingdom (2010–present)
 Blaze and the Monster Machines (2015–present)
 Blue's Clues & You! (2019–present)
 Bubble Guppies (2011–present)
 Butterbean's Café (2019–present)
 Calvin and Kaison’s Play Power
 Deer Squad (2020–present)
 PAW Patrol (2014–present)
 Peppa Pig (2004–present)
 Play Along With Sam (2013–present)
 Ready Set Dance
 Ricky Zoom 
 Ryan's Mystery Playdate
 Santiago of the Seas (2020–present)

Former Programming

 64 Zoo Lane (2005–2008)
 Angelina Ballerina (2004–2012)
 The Backyardigans (2005–2019)
 Balamory (2004–2008)
 Beat Bugs (2016-2019)
 Bing (2018-2020)
 Bill and Ben (2004–2006)
 Blue's Clues (2004–2012)
 Blue's Room (2004–2012)
 Bob the Builder (2004-2007)
 Busy Buses (2004–2007)
 Buzzy Bee and Friends (2009–2012)
 Cooking For Kids with Luis (2004–2007)
 Curious George (2008-2021)
 The Day Henry Met (2015-2020)
 Digby Dragon (2016-2019)
 Dino Dan (2009-2012)
 Dinosaur Train (2009-2014)
 Didi and B. (2012-2021)
 Dora and Friends: Into the City! (2013-2020) (Now On 10 Shake)
 Dora the Explorer (2004-2021) (Now On 10 Shake)
 The Doozers (2013-2018)
 Engie Benjy (2004-2007)
 Ethelbert the Tiger (2004-2006)
 The Fairies (2005–2006)
 Fifi and the Flowertots (2005–2014)
 The Fresh Beat Band (2009-2015)
 Fresh Beat Band of Spies (2015-2020) (Moved to 10 Shake)
 Franny's Feet (2006–2013)
 Gardening for Kids with Madi (2004–2007)
 Go, Diego, Go! (2006–2021)
 Hana's Helpline (2007–2009)
 Harry and His Bucket Full of Dinosaurs (2006–2012)
 Henry's World (2004–2005)
 Hi-5 (2004–2016)
 Hi-5 House (2013-2016)
 Julius Jr. (2014-2017)
 Kid-E-Cats (2017-2020)
 The Kingdom of Paramithi (2008–2012)
 Kipper (2004–2007)
 Kiva Can Do! (2016-2019)
 The Koala Brothers (2004–2007)
 Lalaloopsy (2014-2017)
 Lah-Lah (2009–2010)
 LazyTown (2005-2012)
 Little Bear (2004-2008)
 Little Bill (2004–2008)
 Little Charmers (2016-2018)
 Little Robots (2004–2007)
 Maggie and the Ferocious Beast (2004–2008)
 Maisy (2004–2007)
 Make Way for Noddy (2004–2007)
 Max & Ruby (2012–2019)
 Martha Speaks (2009–2016)
 Miffy and Friends (2004–2007)
 Minuscule (2007–2015)
 Miss Spider's Sunny Patch Friends (2005–2008)
 Mutt & Stuff (2016-2019)
 My Friend Mark (2007-2014)
 Nella the Princess Knight (2017-2020)
 Ni Hao, Kai-Lan (2008–2012)
 Noddy (2004–2007)
 Olive the Ostrich (2012-2015)
 Open Sesame (2004–2012)
 Oswald (2004–2008)
 Pablo the Little Red Fox (2004-2006)
 The Paz Show (2004–2006)
 Percy's Tiger Tales (2012-2016)
 Pic Me (2007–2009)
 Play Along with Ollie (2004–2013)
 Poppy Cat (2012-2016)
 Puffin Rock (2017-2018)
 Rusty Rivets (2018-2021)
 The Save-Ums! (2004–2008)
 Shaun the Sheep (2009–2021)
 Shimmer and Shine (2015-2021) (Now On 10 Shake)
 Sid the Science Kid (2009-2012)
 Sunny Day (2017-2020) (Moved to 10 Shake)
 Super Why! (2009-2014)
 Team Umizoomi (2010-2021) (Now On 10 Shake)
 Thomas the Tank Engine & Friends (2004–2008)
 Tickety Toc (2012-2015)
 Top Wing (2018-2021) (Now On 10 Shake)
 The Upside Down Show (2007–2013)
 Wallykazam! (2014-2018)
 Wanda and the Alien (2013-2016)
 Wonder Pets! (2006–2014)
 Wow! Wow! Wubbzy! (2007–2013) (later aired on ABC kids)
 Wobbly Land (2007–2008)
 Yo Gabba Gabba! (2008–2018)
 Zack & Quack (2014-2019)
 Zoofari

Future programming
 Face's Music Party
 The Tiny Chef Show

Logos

Presenters
 Face (14 March 2004 – 2006), (1998-2006, block)
 Ollie the Australian Muppet (2004 – 2013)

See also
 Nick Jr. (United States)
 Nickelodeon (United States)
 Nickelodeon (Australia and New Zealand)

References

External links
 

Australia
Children's television channels in Australia
Commercial-free television networks in Australia
English-language television stations in Australia
English-language television stations in New Zealand
Television channels and stations established in 1998
1998 establishments in Australia